Playlist Your Way is a compilation album by K-Ci & JoJo released on August 5, 2008, by Universal Records as part of the Playlist Your Way Hits CD series.

Track listing
 "Last Night's Letter"                        	4:38
 "You Bring Me Up"                            	4:24
 "All My Life"                                	5:26
 "How Could You"                              	4:57
 "Don't Rush (Take Love Slowly)"              	3:14
 "Crazy"                                      	4:23
 "This Very Moment"                           	4:03
 "Now and Forever"                            	4:39
 "Love Ballad"                                	3:54
 "I Wanna Do You Right"                       	4:29
 "How Long Must I Cry"                        	3:50
 "All the Things I Should Have Known"         	5:29
 "Life"                                       	3:33
 "Tell Me It's Real"                          	4:39

References

2008 greatest hits albums
K-Ci & JoJo albums